The 2019–20 season was Queens Park Rangers' fifth consecutive season in the Championship. Along with the Championship, the club participated in the FA Cup and the EFL Cup.

The season covered the period from 1 July 2019 to 22 July 2020.

Players

First team squad

Kit
Supplier: Erreà / Sponsor: BetUK.com

Kit information
QPR agreed a multi-year partnership with Erreà as the official technical kit suppliers, the 2019/20 season will be the third year of the deal. The kits will be 100 per-cent bespoke designs for the duration of the deal.

The 2019/20 season will be the final year of a three-year shirt sponsorship deal with online casino Royal Panda. On 29 January 2020, it was confirmed that Leo-Vegas gaming company Bet UK would take over the sponsorship as QPR's main sponsor for the remainder of 2019/20 season.

It was confirmed that if there was a requirement for a third strip the 2018/19 pink away kit would be utilised.

New contracts

Transfers

Transfers in

Loans in

Loans out

Transfers out

Friendlies

For the 2019/20 season, QPR have announced pre-season friendlies against Austria Vienna, Boreham Wood, Oxford United and Watford.

Competitions

Overview

Goals

Clean sheets

Disciplinary record

Notes

References

Queens Park Rangers F.C. seasons
Queens Park Rangers